The 34th American Society of Cinematographers Awards were held on January 25, 2020, at the Hollywood & Highland Ray Dolby Ballroom, honoring the best cinematographers of film and television in 2019.

The nominees were announced on January 2, 2020.

Nominees

Film

Outstanding Achievement in Cinematography in Theatrical Release
Roger Deakins, ASC, BSC – 1917
Phedon Papamichael, ASC, GSC – Ford v Ferrari
Rodrigo Prieto, ASC, AMC – The Irishman
Robert Richardson, ASC – Once Upon a Time in Hollywood
Lawrence Sher, ASC – Joker

Spotlight Award
The Spotlight Award recognizes outstanding cinematography in features and documentaries that are typically screened at film festivals, in limited theatrical release, or outside the United States.
Jarin Blaschke – The Lighthouse
Natasha Braier, ASC, ADF – Honey Boy
Jasper Wolf, NSC – Monos

Outstanding Achievement in Cinematography in Documentary
Fejmi Daut and Samir Ljuma – Honeyland
Nicholas de Pencier – Anthropocene: The Human Epoch
Evangelia Kranioti – Obscuro Barroco

Television

Outstanding Achievement in Cinematography in Regular Series for Non-Commercial Television
Colin Watkinson, ASC, BSC – The Handmaid's Tale (Episode: "Night") (Hulu)
David Luther – Das Boot (Episode: "Gegen die Zeit") (Sky)
M. David Mullen, ASC – The Marvelous Mrs. Maisel (Episode: "Simone") (Amazon)
Chris Seager, BSC – Carnival Row (Episode: "Grieve No More") (Amazon)
Brendan Steacy, CSC – Titans (Episode: "Dick Grayson") (DC Universe)

Outstanding Achievement in Cinematography in Regular Series for Commercial Television
C. Kim Miles, CSC, MySC – Project Blue Book (Episode: "The Flatwoods Monster") (History)
Dana Gonzales, ASC – Legion (Episode: "Chapter 20") (FX)
Polly Morgan, ASC, BSC – Legion (Episode: "Chapter 23") (FX)
Peter Robertson, ISC – Vikings (Episode: "Hell") (History)
David Stockton, ASC – Gotham (Episode: "Ace Chemicals") (FOX)

Outstanding Achievement in Cinematography in Motion Picture, Miniseries, or Pilot Made for Television
John Conroy, ISC – The Terror: Infamy (Episode: "A Sparrow in a Swallow's Nest") (AMC)
P.J. Dillon, ISC – The Rook (Episode: "Chapter 1") (Starz)
Chris Manley, ASC – Doom Patrol (DC Universe)*
Martin Ruhe, ASC – Catch-22 (Episode: "Episode 5") (Hulu)
Craig Wrobleski, CSC – The Twilight Zone (Episode: "Blurryman") (CBS All Access)

Other awards
Lifetime Achievement Award: Frederick Elmes, ASC
Career Achievement in Television Award: Donald A. Morgan, ASC
International Award: Bruno Delbonnel, ASC, AFC
Presidents Award: Don McCuaig, ASC

References

2019
2019 film awards
2019 television awards
American
2019 in American cinema